Andrej Hodek (born 24 May 1981) is a Slovak football forward.

He was signed by Trnava in summer 2013 and made his debut for them against Senica on 13 July 2013.

External links
Corgoň Liga profile

at nl.br.calcio.tv

References

1981 births
Living people
Slovak footballers
Association football forwards
FC Zbrojovka Brno players
FK Inter Bratislava players
FC Petržalka players
FC ViOn Zlaté Moravce players
FC Spartak Trnava players
Slovak Super Liga players
Czech First League players
Footballers from Bratislava